Laxmikanta Mohapatra (18 December 1888 - 24 February 1953) was an Indian Odia poet, writer, performance artist and freedom fighter. More than ten of his books have been published. He was a leading campaigner of the Odisha State unification movement and an eminent member of Utkala Sammilani.

Early life and family 
Laxmikanta was born on 18 December 1888, at Talapada, Tihidi Block of Bhadrak District. His father was zamindar Choudhary Bhagabat Prasad Samantaray Mohapatra and his mother's name was Radhamani Devi. He was native of Talapada village in Bhadrak district which was part of the then Bengal Presidency. His father represented Bihar & Orissa Legislative Council for four times and served as its deputy speaker for twice.

Laxmikanta spent his childhood in his maternal uncle's house and studied in Balasore. He studied at Kolkata's Pion College for higher education after passing Intermediate. He returned to Ravenshaw College in 1913 and completed his Bachelor of Arts degree.

He was married to Labanga Lata, the daughter of zamindar Lalmohan Das.

He was afflicted with leprosy at early in his career and lost his physical movements. However It did not stop him from remaining active in the literary scene.

Literary life  

Lakshmikanta created literary works in drama, parody, poetry, short-story, novel genres. His literary style had a nationalistic fervour and sharp satire. He was one of the few writers who made significant contributions to Odia literature during the period when its existence was threatened. As a political critic, his acerbic criticism of politicians and feudal chiefs earned him an adverse reputation. He was also a musician and an actor . He has also contributed enormously to the rich tradition of performing arts in Orissa. He created a dramatic troupe call Gopinath Natya Samaj at his village.
Kantakabi's songs like  were a battle cry of Odia freedom fighters during freedom struggle and state-hood movement. His composition Bande Utkala Janani was adopted as the welcome song for Balasore Session of Utkal Sammilani, the organization which sphere-headed the separate Orissa state movement. This song was accorded the status of state anthem of Odisha in 2020.

Published works

Novel
 Kana Mamu

Short story
 Budha Sankhari

Mythology
 Basanta Bilasa
 Baruna Bijaya
 Kaliyadalana 
 Brajabarjana
 Besabadala

Plays
 Karna
 Kalapahada
 Chandraahasa

Children's literature
 Chidiakhana
 Dharma Sangeeta
 Balachara
 Sunapua 
 Mo Desa

Essays
 Keisora Swapna
 Joubana Pathe 
 Nibhruta Nisithe
 Jibanta Maran

Laxmikant published a journal called “Dagara“, which published articles in various genres such as satire, children's stories, political and societal criticism etc.

References

1888 births
1953 deaths
Novelists from Odisha
People from Bhadrak district
Odia-language writers
19th-century Indian novelists
19th-century Indian short story writers